Born of Osiris is an American progressive metalcore band formed in 2003 in Palatine, Illinois, a suburb of Chicago. The band currently consists of lead vocalist Ronnie Canizaro, lead guitarist Lee McKinney, rhythm guitarist/bassist Nick Rossi, drummer Cameron Losch, and keyboardist/vocalist Joe Buras. Born of Osiris has played at various festivals including the Summer Slaughter Tour (2008, 2009, 2015 and 2018) and the Music as a Weapon Tour 4.

The group underwent several name changes, including Diminished (2003–2004),  Your Heart Engraved (2004–2006), and Rosecrance (2006–2007), before finally settling on Born of Osiris in 2007, basing the name on the Egyptian deity Osiris and the tale of his son Horus.

History

Early years and The New Reign (2003–2007) 
In its early years, the band was part of the Northland Chicago metalcore scene along with other (now successfully signed) bands such as Veil of Maya, Monsters, Oceano, and For All I Am. The band members attended the same high school, Fremd High School.

While known as Diminished in 2003, they released a five-song demo EP titled Your Heart Engraved These Messages. This was the only release from the teenage band to feature two lead vocalists.

From that demo came their next name, Your Heart Engraved. Under that name, the band released a twelve-song demo known as Youm Wara Youm. During that time, the band also released a satirical rap song titled "Stressed". The song was originally featured on the band's Myspace account.

The band changed names once again in 2006, this time to Rosecrance. They released a self-titled seven-track demo EP, containing re-recordings of songs off their second demo and  two extra satirical rap songs, named "HopeYouDie" and "Paddy Wack". The latter was based on the nursery rhyme of the same name.

In 2007, the group settled on Born of Osiris as a suitable band name. The first Born of Osiris song released was "Narnia", which would later be retitled "The Takeover" on The New Reign. The New Reign marked the end of their satirical rap songs and old post-hardcore/metalcore sound, and it marked the beginning of their critically acclaimed technical deathcore sound as well as the start of their stay with Sumerian Records.

A Higher Place, The Discovery and Richardson's departure (2008–2012) 
In July 2009, the band released their debut album, A Higher Place, which peaked at number 73 on the Billboard 200. They co-headlined a tour named The Night of the Living Shred with All Shall Perish, After the Burial, Caliban and Suffokate; Born of Osiris also supported Hatebreed on the Decimation of the Nation Tour 2, alongside Cannibal Corpse, Unearth and Hate Eternal.

In December 2009, they asked Jason Richardson of All Shall Perish to join Born of Osiris. This began a two-year period of member stability which resulted in the writing and release of their second full-length album, The Discovery. Released on March 22, 2011, the album debuted at 87 on the Billboard 200.

In September 2011, members Cameron Losch, Joe Buras, and Lee McKinney recorded and mixed the self-titled first release by Virginia band Mind's I.

On December 21, 2011, Born of Osiris fired guitarist Jason Richardson. The official press release came three weeks later. Richardson immediately joined Salt Lake City deathcore act Chelsea Grin following his departure from the band. In response to the official statement released by the band, he wrote a scathing status update on his personal Facebook page, stating that the other band members frequently abused alcohol and prescription drugs. Richardson had served as a touring member with Chelsea Grin prior to him being kicked out of the band.

A video was posted, showing guitarist Lee McKinney rehearsing over a riff, which was believed to be part of a song to be featured on the next Born of Osiris release. He also had an eight string guitar built for him by the UK-based company Invictus Guitars, suggesting another direction that the next release will take.

Following this, McKinney started a side project called Mechanize (originally named Mecha but the name had to be changed for legal reasons), in which he produces original electronic music and remixes other artists. David Darocha has also started his own jewelry line called D A V I. Cameron Losch, Lee McKinney and former guitarist Jason Richardson were all instructors on the music teaching website Bandhappy, which was owned by Matt Halpern, the drummer of Born of Osiris's former labelmate Periphery. As of November 2014, however, Halpern had shut down the site to focus on Periphery.

Tomorrow We Die Alive and Soul Sphere (2013–2015) 
On June 25, 2013, the Sumerian Records YouTube page uploaded a Born of Osiris song entitled "M∆chine" as well as an album titled Tomorrow We Die Alive, which was released August 20, 2013. They toured across North America on the 2013 Rockstar Mayhem Festival alongside groups like Five Finger Death Punch, Rob Zombie and Machine Head. Born of Osiris also supported Asking Alexandria on their Breakdown the Walls Tour alongside August Burns Red, Crown the Empire and We Came as Romans. The band also played on the Monster Energy Stage for the 2014 Vans Warped Tour and headlined in October 2014 to support Tomorrow We Die Alive. Within the Ruins, ERRA, Betraying the Martyrs and Thy Art Is Murder all supported the band. The band also opened up for The Devil Wears Prada with The Word Alive and Secrets joining as support in early 2015. Mid-2015 saw the band open up for Arch Enemy on the 2015 annual Summer Slaughter tour. In September 2015 the band went to Russia to support Emmure on a small tour.

The new album, Soul Sphere was released on October 23, 2015. In February 2016, The band was the headliner for the Sumerian Records Ten Year Tour. Veil of Maya, After the Burial, ERRA and Bad Omens joined them on the lineup. A second leg of the tour started in May with Upon a Burning Body being added to the lineup, replacing Veil of Maya. The band played in Europe in September 2016, with Veil of Maya as a co-headliner and with Volumes and Black Crown Initiate joining as support.

The Eternal Reign and The Simulation (2016–2020) 
At the turn of 2017, the band released a new song titled "Glorious Day", which is a re-recording of a track originally included on their 2004 demo, Youm Wara Youm, and which was originally intended to appear on their 2007 EP The New Reign.

Following the unrevealing of "Glorious Day", Born of Osiris announced that they were in the process of developing a new EP entitled The Eternal Reign — a re-recording of The New Reign EP. After this, the band toured to celebrate The New Reign's tenth anniversary. The first half of the tour featured Volumes, Oceans Ate Alaska, and Within the Ruins and Fire From the Gods as support. The second half had Volumes return with Betraying the Martyrs and Widowmaker. The Eternal Reign was released in February 2017.

In 2018, the band departed on the Summer Slaughter tour. On July 16, 2018, they released the first single, titled "Silence the Echo," and announced the departure of longtime bassist, David Da Rocha, who has been featured in all Sumerian releases with the band. Nick Rossi of In Motives was introduced as his replacement. In 2018, Born of Osiris took part in the annual Summer Slaughter Tour, supporting Between the Buried and Me. Born of Osiris went on tour once again in the Fall of 2018, this time supporting Killswitch Engage. Crowbar and Death Ray Vision joined as support.

On November 16, 2018, the band released their second single, "The Accursed", from their fifth studio album, The Simulation. The album was released on January 11, 2019. It was said to be the first of two Born of Osiris albums planned for release in 2019, though the second album was not released that year as previously announced. On February 7, 2019, the band embarked on an approximate one month-long tour to support The Simulation alongside Chelsea Grin, Make Them Suffer and Kingdom of Giants. Born of Osiris also returned to Australia in June 2019 co-headlining with Chelsea Grin. Diamond Construct joined as support.

On May 7, 2020, former guitarist Jason Richardson revealed that, after over nine years of attempting to claim his royalty fees for his work on The Discovery, Sumerian Records had paid him the outstanding debt.

Angel or Alien and upcoming seventh studio album (2021–present) 
On March 18, 2021, the band released a new single called "White Nile" accompanied by a music video.  On May 13, 2021, the band release a new single and music video entitled "Angel or Alien" and announced the release of a new album with the same name for July 2, 2021.

Born of Osiris started writing a follow-up album to Angel or Alien as early as February in 2022.

Members

Current members
 Cameron Losch – drums (2003–present)
 Ronnie Canizaro – lead vocals (2003–present)
 Joe Buras – keyboards, synthesizers, backing vocals (2003–present)
 Lee McKinney – lead guitar (2008–2009, 2011–present); rhythm guitar (2007–2021)
 Nick Rossi – bass (2018–present); rhythm guitar (2021–present)

Current touring musicians
 Patrick Hodges – bass (2022–present)

Former members
 Trevor Hurlbert – lead vocals (2003)
 Mike Mancebo – keyboards, synthesizers (2003)
 Joe Phillips – rhythm guitar (2003–2004)
 Austin Krause – bass (2003–2005)
 Dan Laabs – bass (2005–2007)
 Mike Shanahan – lead guitar (2003–2007); rhythm guitar (2003)
 Joel Negus – rhythm guitar (2004–2007)
 Matt Pantelis – lead guitar (2007–2008)
 Jason Richardson – lead guitar (2009–2011)
 David Darocha – bass (2007–2018)

Former touring musicians
 Tosin Abasi – guitars (2009)
 Lee Evans – guitars (2009, 2012–2013)

Timeline

Discography

Studio albums

EPs
 The New Reign (2007)
 The Eternal Reign (2017)

Demos
 Your Heart Engraved These Messages (2003) (recorded while known as Diminished)
 Youm Wara Youm (2004) (recorded while known as Your Heart Engraved)
 Rosecrance (2005) (recorded while known as Rosecrance)
 Preview Promo (2006) (demo containing two tracks, "July 4th" (re-recorded version of "Sight and Sounds" from the Rosecrance EP and "New Years Final")
 Narnia (2007) (single song demo which eventually became "The Takeover" featured on the band's The New Reign EP)
 Pre-Production Demo (2008) (4-track demo of instrumentals from A Higher Place)

Singles
 "Stressed" (2005)
 "HopeYouDie" (2006)
 "Bow Down" (2007)
 "Now Arise" (2009)
 "Recreate" (2011)
 "Follow the Signs" (2012)
 "Machine" (2013)
 "Divergency" (2013)
 "Throw Me in the Jungle" (2015)
 "Resilience" (2015)
 "The Other Half of Me (2016)
 "Illuminate" (2016)
 "Empires Erased" (2017)
 "Glorious Day" (2017)
 "Silence the Echo" (2018)
 "The Accursed" (2018)
 "Cycles of Tragedy" (2019)
 "Under the Gun" (2019)
 "White Nile" (2021)
 "Angel or Alien" (2021)
 "Poster Child" (2021)
 "Shadowmourne" (2021)
 "Oathbreaker" (2021)

Music videos

References

External links
Born of Osiris  at Sumerian Records

2003 establishments in Illinois
American deathcore musical groups
Metalcore musical groups from Illinois
Egyptian mythology in music
Musical groups established in 2003
Musical groups from Chicago
Musical quintets
Sumerian Records artists